Trevor Baxter (18 November 1932 – 16 July 2017) was a British actor and playwright. He was educated at Dulwich College and the Royal Academy of Dramatic Art.

Early years
A postal worker's son, Baxter was born in Lewisham, London, England, and was educated at Dulwich College and the Royal Academy of Dramatic Art.

Career
His credits include: Adam Adamant Lives!, Z-Cars, Maelstrom, Thriller, The New Avengers, Jack the Ripper, (1988) The Barchester Chronicles (1982) An Englishman Abroad (1983) and Doctors. He is known for his appearance in the Doctor Who serial The Talons of Weng-Chiang (1977) as Professor George Litefoot and in 1978 in Rumpole of the Bailey. He reprised his role of Professor Litefoot in an episode of the audio series, Doctor Who: The Companion Chronicles: The Mahogany Murderers. The following year he was Professor Litefoot again for a continuing series of Jago & Litefoot.

Trevor Baxter worked with the Royal Shakespeare Company (RSC) and in the West End, toured Shakespeare in South America with Sir Ralph Richardson, and also appeared in the US in David Mamet's A Life in the Theatre at Shakespeare Santa Cruz in 1986. He appeared in many films including Nutcracker (1983), Parting Shots (1999), Sky Captain and the World of Tomorrow (2004) and Van Wilder: The Rise of Taj (2006).

He also wrote a number of plays  including Lies, The Undertaking, and Office Games. His play Ripping Them Off was given its first performance at the Warehouse Theatre Croydon on 5 October 1990, directed by Ted Craig and designed by Michael Pavelka. The cast consisted of: Ian Targett (Graham),  Angus Mackay (Revd. Parkinson), Caroline Blakiston (Grace), Annette Badland (Hilda),  Frank Ellis (Julian), Ewart James Walters (Max), Anthony Woodruff (Pauken), Ian Burford (Inspector Sands), Richard Clifford (Jeff) and C.P. Grogan (Susanna).

In 2003, he adapted Oscar Wilde's novella The Picture of Dorian Gray for the stage, followed in March 2005 by a touring version of Wilde's short story, Lord Arthur Savile's Crime, revived in January 2010 at the Theatre Royal Windsor, starring Lee Mead in the title role.

Baxter continued to record Doctor Who audio dramas for Big Finish Productions as Professor Litefoot, having completed thirteen series.

On 17 July 2017, it was announced that Trevor Baxter had died the previous day. The cause of death was not made public.

Filmography

Film

Television

References

External links
 

1932 births
2017 deaths
Alumni of RADA
British male television actors
People educated at Dulwich College
People from Lewisham